Agelasta tonkinea is a species of beetle in the family Cerambycidae. It was described by Pic in 1925.

Subspecies
 Agelasta tonkinea omeishana Gressitt, 1951
 Agelasta tonkinea palminsulana (Gressitt, 1940)
 Agelasta tonkinea tonkinea Pic, 1925

References

tonkinea
Beetles described in 1925